Vichithra is an Indian actress who has predominantly appeared in Tamil films. She has also appeared in a few Telugu, Malayalam and Kannada films.

Career
Her breakthrough came in the form of a glamorous role in Selva's Thalaivasal (1992), where she played a character known as 'Madippu' Hamsa. She has appeared in supporting roles, notably in Rasigan (1994), Muthu (1995) and Suyamvaram (1999). She briefly forayed into a career in television, playing a leading role in the drama Maami Chinna Maami. She has settled in Pune after marriage and has retired from films.

Personal life
She is the daughter of actor Williams and Mary Vasantha, and has two sisters and a brother. Her father was murdered during a robbery incident in September 2011.

Filmography

Television

References

Living people
Actresses in Telugu cinema
Actresses in Tamil cinema
Indian film actresses
Actresses in Malayalam cinema
20th-century Indian actresses
21st-century Indian actresses
Actresses in Kannada cinema
Actresses in Tamil television
Actresses in Malayalam television
Actresses in Telugu television
1973 births